Monilispira bandata is a species of sea snail, a marine gastropod mollusc in the family Pseudomelatomidae.

Description
The length of the shell attains 4.3 mm.

Distribution
This marine species occurs off Barbados and Guadeloupe.

References

 Nowell-Usticke, G. W. "A supplementary listing of new shells (illustrated)." To be added to the check list of the marine shells of St. Croix. Published privately 6 (1969).

External links
 MNHN: specimen
 
 Gastropods.com: Crassispira bandata

bandata
Gastropods described in 1969